George Cowper may refer to:
 George Cowper (cricketer), Australian cricketer
 George Cowper, 6th Earl Cowper, British politician

See also
 George Clavering-Cowper, 3rd Earl Cowper, English peer